"The Junior Mint" is the 60th episode of the NBC sitcom Seinfeld. It is the 20th episode of the fourth season. It aired on March 18, 1993. In the episode, Jerry cannot remember the name of the woman he is dating and learns that it rhymes with a part of the female anatomy. Meanwhile, Elaine's artistic ex-boyfriend develops a lethal infection after Jerry and Kramer drop a Junior Mint into his body during a surgical operation. This episode won Michael Richards his first Emmy of the series.

Plot
Jerry is unable to remember the name of the woman he is dating. As it would be too awkward to simply ask her given the time they have spent together, he tells her that people made fun of his name in school and asks if kids ever made fun of her name. She affirms that she was relentlessly teased because her name rhymes with a part of the female anatomy. Jerry and George come up with possible candidates, with George suggesting Mulva (for vulva). She presses him to say her name. Jerry guesses Mulva, causing her to storm out of his apartment. Moments after she leaves, in a flash of insight, Jerry runs to the window and yells "Dolores!" (rhyming with a common pronunciation of clitoris).

Elaine goes to the hospital to visit her ex-boyfriend Roy, an artist who she dumped because he was fat. Noticing that he has slimmed down due to depression from her breaking up with him, Elaine becomes interested in dating him again. Kramer and Jerry observe the artist's splenectomy in the hospital's operating theater and accidentally drop a Junior Mint from the viewing gallery into his body. When George hears that Roy has developed an infection, he spends $1,900 (which he collected in interest from a bank account from the sixth grade) to buy some of Roy's art, thinking it will appreciate in value when Roy dies. Roy's condition suddenly turns around and he recovers. Although Roy attributes the change to George buying his art, the doctor attributes the limited effect of the infection to "something from above." As Kramer offers the doctor a Junior Mint, Elaine decides to cancel her date with Roy, whom she observes eating enthusiastically again in his hospital room.

Production
According to the "Inside Look" from the DVD, the writers had trouble coming up with a name for Jerry's girlfriend, initially settling upon "Cloris". When filming the episode, a comedian would warm up the studio audience in between filming scenes and, as an exercise, asked audience members to guess Jerry's girlfriend's name; one audience member guessed Dolores, which was deemed a better fit than their first choice. Jerry Seinfeld approved of it in time to add it to the script and the scene was shot with that being the character's name. Afterwards, a producer for the show was amused to overhear the audience member's husband saying "you guessed right!"

Jerry's line concerning Roy, "Then we can go watch 'em slice this fat bastard up", was improvised by Seinfeld.

A York Peppermint Pattie was used for filming the scene in the operating theater, as a Junior Mint was too small for the camera.

In popular culture

The episode was mentioned on the Family Guy episode "E. Peterbus Unum". The scene with the Junior Mint falling into the patient is shown on episode five of The Orville.

The episode was referenced in the case Mackenzie v. Miller Brewing Co., where the plaintiff, Jerold J. Mackenzie, was fired for "poor management judgment" after discussing the episode's references to female sexual anatomy.

References

External links 
 

Seinfeld (season 4) episodes
1993 American television episodes